Laboratory informatics is the specialized application of information technology aimed at optimizing and extending laboratory operations. It encompasses data acquisition (e.g. through sensors and hardware or voice), instrument interfacing, laboratory networking, data processing, specialized data management systems (such as a chromatography data system), a laboratory information management system, scientific data management (including data mining and data warehousing), and knowledge management (including the use of an electronic lab notebook). It has become more prevalent with the rise of other "informatics" disciplines such as bioinformatics, cheminformatics and health informatics. Several graduate programs are focused on some form of laboratory informatics, often with a clinical emphasis. A closely related - some consider subsuming - field is laboratory automation.

Capability Areas 
In the context of Public Health Laboratories, the Association of Public Health Laboratories has identified 19 areas for self-assessment of laboratory informatics in their Laboratories Efficiencies Initiative. These include the following Capability Areas.

 Laboratory Test Request and Sample Receiving
 Test Preparation, LIMS Processing, Test Results Recording and Verification
 Report Preparation and Distribution
 Laboratory Test Scheduling
 Prescheduled Testing
 Specimen and Sample Tracking/Chain of Custody
 Media, Reagents, Controls: Manufacturing and Inventory
 Interoperability and Data Exchange
 Statistical Analysis and Surveillance
 Billing for Laboratory Services
 Contract and Grant Management
 Training, Education and Resource Management
 Laboratory Certifications/Licensing
 Customer Relationship Management
 Quality Control (QC) and Quality Assurance (QA) Management
 Laboratory Safety and Accident Investigation
 Laboratory Mutual Assistance/Disaster Recovery
 Core IT Service Management: Hardware, Software and Services
 Policies and Procedures, including Budgeting and Funding

Sub-topics 
 Laboratory information management system (LIMS)
 Chromatography data system (CDS)
 Electronic lab notebook (ELN)
List of ELN software packages

Organizations 
 Society for Laboratory Automation & Screening (SLAS)
 American Association for Clinical Chemistry (AACC)
 Laboratory Informatics Institute

Publications 
 American Laboratory

See also 
 Informatics

Further reading 
 Nakagawa, Allen S., LIMS implementation and management, Cambridge: Royal Society of Chemistry, 1994
 Liscouski, Joe, Laboratory and Scientific Computing a Strategic Approach, John Wiley & Sons, New York, 1995
 Gibbon, Gerst, "A Brief History of LIMS", Laboratory Automation and Information Management 1996, 32(1), 1-5
 Myers, J. D.; Fox-Dobbs, C.; Laird, J.; Le, Dai; Reich, D.; Curtz, T., "Electronic laboratory notebooks for collaborative research", In Proceedings of the 5th International Workshops on Enabling Technologies: Infrastructure for Collaborative Enterprises (WET ICE'96) (WET-ICE '96) IEEE Computer Society, Washington, DC, USA, 1996, 47-.
 Paszko, Christine; Pugsley, Carol, "Considerations in selecting a laboratory information management system (LIMS)", American Laboratory, 2000, 32(18), 38-42
 Paszko, Christine; Turner, Elizabeth; Hinton, Mary D., Laboratory Information Management Systems, Revised & Expanded. CRC Press, 2001
 Tracy, Douglas S.; Nash, Robert A., "A Validation Approach for Laboratory Information Management Systems", Journal of Validation Technology, 2002, 9(1), 6-14
 Perry, Douglas, "Laboratory Informatics: Origin, Scope, and its Place in Higher Education", Journal of the Association for Laboratory Automation, 2004, 9(6), 421 - 428
 Sterling, James D., "Laboratory Automation Education", Journal of the Association for Laboratory Automation, 2004, 9(5), A11-A12
 Sterling, James D., "Laboratory automation curriculum at Keck Graduate Institute", Journal of the Association for Laboratory Automation, 2004, 9(5), 331-335
 Taylor, Keith, "The status of electronic laboratory notebooks for chemistry and biology", Current Opinion in Drug Discovery & Development, 2006, 9(3): 348-353
 Wood, Simon,  "Comprehensive Laboratory Informatics: A Multilayer Approach", American Laboratory, 2007, 39(16), 20-23
 Metrick, Gloria, "Three Issues of LIMS/Laboratory Informatics That Can Cost Money", American Laboratory, 2007, 39(21), 10-11
 Calva, Diana; Lehman, Mario, "An analysis of the possible applications of Artificial Intelligence Techniques to a Clinical Laboratory Information Management System", International Journal of Computer Science and Network Security, 2008, 8(12), 82-86
 Shah, Kim, "Elevating laboratory informatics to assist decision-making", Pharmaceutical Technology Europe, 2009, 21(5)

References 

Laboratory equipment
Science software
Health informatics
Data management software